Thasos (Thásos) is a town on the island of Thasos in northern Greece. It is the capital and main town of the island. The town is also called Limenas Thasou or for short just Limenas (Liménas Thásou, "Harbour of Thasos") to distinguish the town from the island on which it is situated.

History 
The current town was built west from the ancient town. In and around Thasos, there are many ruins dating from antiquity. Most of the finds from local archaeological sites are on display at the Archaeological Museum of Thasos in Thasos town.

References

External links
 Official municipality website

Populated places in Thasos
Ports and harbours of Greece
Populated places in ancient Macedonia
Populated places in the ancient Aegean islands